Uran Khatola is a 1955 Indian Hindi-language romantic-drama film produced by music director Naushad and directed by S.U. Sunny. The film stars Dilip Kumar, Nimmi, Jeevan and Tun Tun. The film's music was composed by Naushad. Songs are written by Shakeel Badayuni. The songs "O door ke musafir ham ko bhi saath le le re","More Saiyan Ji Utrenge Paar","Ghar Aaya Mehman Koi","Mera Salam Le Ja" are popular songs from this film.

Madhubala was initially offered the film, but she refused due to her fluctuating health.

It was dubbed into Tamil and released as Vaanaratham and released on 1 November 1956. Lyrics were penned by Kambadasan and M. B. Sreenivasan.

Plot
Kashi travels by an ill-fated plane, which crashes on the outskirts of an isolated city that is ruled by women, who worship Sanga, their God. Kashi is rescued by pretty Soni and taken to her home, where she lives with her widowed dad, and brother, Hira. Since the roads are blocked, Kashi is unable to return home, and in order to continue to stay there, he must first obtain permission from the Raj Rani, the ultimate ruler. He meets with her and she finds him attractive and charming, and invites him to stay with her at her palace and sing for him, which he does. Kashi and Soni have given their hearts to each other, they meet secretly, with Soni disguised as a man, Shibu. The rest of the story follows how both Soni and Raj Rani try to make Kashi their own.

Cast
 Dilip Kumar as Kashi
 Nimmi as Soni / Shibu
 Jeevan as Shanu
 Agha as Heera
 Tun Tun as Heera's Girlfriend
 Suryakumari as Raj Rani

Music

The film's music was written by Naushad. Vocalists were Mohammed Rafi and Lata Mangeshkar.

References

External links 
 

1955 films
1950s Hindi-language films
Films scored by Naushad
Indian feminist films
Indian fantasy drama films
Indian black-and-white films
Indian romantic drama films
1955 romantic drama films